Distacodontidae is an extinct family of conodonts in the order Conodontophorida.

Genera are Curtognathus and Panderodus.

References

External links 

 
 Distacodontidae at fossilworks.org (retrieved 9 March 2017)

 
Conodont families
Paleozoic conodonts
Ordovician first appearances
Devonian extinctions